In Kosovo, a partially recognised state in Southeastern Europe, the standard time is Central European Time (CET; UTC+01:00). Daylight saving time, which is one hour ahead, is observed from the last Sunday in March (02:00 CET) to the last Sunday in October (03:00 CEST). 

As Kosovo is not an internationally recognised sovereign state, it is not granted a zone.tab entry on the IANA time zone database.

Time notation 
The 24-hour clock is used.

See also 
Time in Europe
Time in Serbia
Time in Albania
Time in Bosnia and Herzegovina

References

External links 
Current time in Kosovo at Time.is